50th Anniversary Additional Commemorative Non-Aligned Meeting was the 5–6 September 2011 Non-Aligned Movement foreign ministers commemorative meeting which took place in Belgrade, Serbia. The meeting took place in the House of the National Assembly of the Republic of Serbia, building which hosted the 1st Summit of the Non-Aligned Movement on 5–12 June 1961 (at the time as the Parliament of Yugoslavia) during the existence of the Socialist Federal Republic of Yugoslavia. The idea for meeting was proposed by the President of Serbia Boris Tadić during his participation at 15th Summit of the Non-Aligned Movement in Sharm el-Sheikh in Egypt. Some 600 delegates, representing over 100 national delegations, attended the meeting.

The meeting was opened by the Minister of Foreign Affairs of Egypt Mohamed Kamel Amr who said “Today's meeting, 50 years after the founding assembly, is an indicator of the strength of our movement and we are grateful to the founders, the historic leaders who led our movement”. In his speech, President of Serbia Tadić underlined that his country has increased UN peacekeeping contribution in a number of NAM countries and established a “World in Serbia” scholarship fund enabling hundreds each year to study at the University of Belgrade. Minister of Foreign Affairs and Trade of Brunei Prince Mohamed Bolkiah stated that the city of Belgrade is linked forever to the Non-Aligned Movement.

One of the motivations for the meeting was the opportunity to discus the Kosovo independence precedent with member states of the Non-Aligned Movement. Croatia, another one of the six former Yugoslav republics, underlined its plans to actively participate in the conference stressing that Zagreb believes that its forthcoming accession to the European Union does not rule out development of its relations with NAM member states. Alongside Croatia, Slovenia, Montenegro and FRY Macedonia among former Yugoslav states attended the event. Egyptian Minister of Foreign Affairs called all former Yugoslavia countries who have yet to recognize Palestine as an independent country to do so. Other European countries in attendance as guests were Hungary, Finland, Spain and Cyprus, last of which was a member state in parallel with Yugoslavia and up until 2004.

References

See also
 Yugoslavia and the Non-Aligned Movement
 60th Anniversary Additional Commemorative Non-Aligned Meeting

Anniversary
Foreign relations of Serbia
Foreign relations of Yugoslavia
2010s in Belgrade
2011 conferences
2011 in politics
2011 in Serbia